Kudintsevo is a rural locality and the administrative center of Kudintsevky Selsoviet Rural Settlement, Lgovsky District, Kursk Oblast, Russia. Population:

Geography 
The village is located on the Seym River, 51 km from the Russia–Ukraine border, 70 km west of Kursk, 9 km north-west of the district center – the town Lgov.

 Climate
Kudintsevo has a warm-summer humid continental climate (Dfb in the Köppen climate classification).

Transport 
Kudintsevo is located 37 km from the road of regional importance  (Fatezh – Dmitriyev), 13.5 km from the road  (Konyshyovka – Zhigayevo – 38K-038), 5.5 km from the road  (Lgov – Konyshyovka), 9 km from the road  (Kursk – Lgov – Rylsk – border with Ukraine), on the road of intermunicipal significance  (Lgov – Kudintsevo), 5 km from the nearest railway station Sherekino (railway line Navlya – Lgov-Kiyevsky).

The rural locality is situated 76 km from Kursk Vostochny Airport, 153 km from Belgorod International Airport and 279 km from Voronezh Peter the Great Airport.

References

Notes

Sources

Rural localities in Lgovsky District